Crimea TITAN is the largest manufacturer of titanium dioxide pigment in Eastern Europe. It is located in Armyansk, Crimea.

Location and geography
The plant is located in Crimea, in the northern part of the Perekop Isthmus near the coast of the Sivash.

History
The decision to build the Crimean State Production Association "TITAN" (KPO "TITAN") [Russian: ] was made 28 Dec 1969. In 1971 a factory producing Ammonium Phosphate was commissioned; in 1973 aluminium sulfate, and water glass; in 1974 red iron oxide pigment; and by 1978 two titanium dioxide pigment plants were commissioned.

In Mar 1999 the KPO "TITAN" became part of the 'Syvash economic zone' [Russian:] - this free economic zone was an initiative of the Government of Ukraine as an experiment. On 10 Feb 2000 the KPO "TITAN" was converted into the state joint stock company SJSC "TITAN" [Russian: ]. On 31 Aug 2004, the closed joint stock company "Crimean TITAN" [Russian: ] was formed comprising 50% less one share held by Ostchem Germany GmbH (controlled by Dmitry Firtash), the remaining majority held by SJSC "TITAN".

Crimea annexation 
After the Annexation of Crimea by the Russian Federation in 2014 a company was registered in Moscow as the private limited company "Titanium Investments" [Russian: ]; whilst the name of the plant itself was changed to "Ukrainian Chemical Products" [Russian: ], with the location of registration of the company changed from Armyansk to Kyiv; and with the Moscow-based company leasing the "Ukrainian Chemical Products" plant, as well as supplying and exporting products. The plant was reliant on the production of two Ukrainian mining and enriching plants at [Vilnohirsk] and [Irshansk] - previously these were leased by the plant but in 2014 they were transferred by the Ukrainian government to the Ministry of the Economy, and transferred to the state-owned "United Mining and Chemical Company" [Russian: ]. The company remained registered as a Ukrainian enterprise, paying tax on profits in Ukraine, though local taxes were also paid in Crimea - as such the company attempted to continue to receive supplies from Ukraine, avoiding sanctions.

Post-2014 the plant suffered with revenue falling by nearly three quarters (from ~$300 million in 2013 to ~$86 million in 2015). Import substitution of Ilmentite from Sri Lanka was confirmed to have begun in 2016. Other issues relating to the Ukraine-Russia-Crimea situation included a lack of water for industrial production due to restrictions on water from Ukraine to supply the North Crimean Canal. Additional wages were reported as being paid at much-reduced levels. In late 2017 it was reported that the business was still suffering shortages of Ilmenite and operating at ~40-50% capacity, and had been receiving ore from Norway, Sri Lanka, and Brazil.

In 2017 Russian state bank VTB began bankruptcy proceedings against Titanium Investments, claiming $40 million in unpaid debts. In reaction Dmitry Firtash sought to transfer the business to a new company "TitanActive" [Russian: ], to avoid effects on the business due to the litigation.

Places close to the titanium plant, namely Armyansk and Perekop, were (first reportedly) on 23 August 2018 hit by a noxious sulphur dioxide gas allegedly coming from the water reservoir of the plant. 4,000 children were evacuated from Armyansk and Ukrainian authorities claimed that by 10 September (2018) dozens of people had sought medical assistance in mainland Ukraine. Crimean ecologist Margarita Litvinenko claimed that gas was caused because the water reservoir of the plant did not contain enough water due to the water shortage in Crimea caused by Ukraine's decision to stop the flow from the North Crimean Canal after the Russian annexation of Crimea.

Production

The plant has two main units («Титан-1» and «Титан-2»), each with a (design) production capacity of 40,000 tons pa.

The production of Titanium dioxide at the plant uses Ilmenite as a feedstock, using concentrated Sulfuric acid to dissolve the ground ore. Iron-based impurities are reduced to Iron (II) in solution; the liquid mixture is then filtered, and Iron (II) is removed by selective crystallization and centrifugal separation upon cooling of the solution. Next, the Titanyl sulfate solution is evaporatively concentrated.

The Titanyl sulfate solution is hydrolyzed producing amorphous flakes of Titanium dioxide, which are then filtered and washed. Filtered Titanium dioxide is then calcined to drive off water. Further surface treatment and grinding may be applied to the Titanium dioxide for specific uses or properties of the Titanium dioxide pigment.

In addition to its primary product (~90% of exports), the plant also generates red iron oxide pigment, mineral fertilizers, sulfuric acid, aluminum sulfate, water glass, iron sulfate, copper sulfate, and alkaline sodium and lithium chemicals.

See also
Types of business entity in Russia
 Chemical incident in Armyansk

References

External links

Companies based in Crimea
Chemical companies of Russia
Chemical companies of Ukraine
Titanium companies
Chemical companies of the Soviet Union
Armiansk